Glen McPherson may refer to:

 Rural Municipality of Glen McPherson No. 46, a rural municipality in Saskatchewan, Canada
 Glen McPherson, a member of the Saskatchewan Legislative Assembly (1991–2000)